Myanmar International School (MIS) is an independent coeducational day school, (Nursery school to Year 13) located in Yangon, Myanmar. It is one of 18 international schools located in Yangon and should not be confused with other similarly named international schools in Myanmar such as MISY. MIS follows the internationally recognized Cambridge International Schools curriculum with a core of academic subjects and a range of enrichment courses and activities and with an international teaching staff.  The current chief education officer of the school is Mr. Peter McMurray.

History 
Myanmar International School was founded in 2009 by the Board of Directors of Than Lwin Aye Yar Services Co. Ltd.  It is located on Pyin Nya Waddy Street adjacent to the Sedona Hotel and close to Inya Lake. The school opened its doors to the first students on 1 September 2009.

Accreditation 
MIS is an officially recognized Cambridge International school which uses the well-known Cambridge system. Myanmar International School has received accreditation to offer:

 Cambridge Primary with Cambridge Primary Checkpoint
 Cambridge Secondary 1 with Cambridge Checkpoint
 Cambridge IGCSE Cambridge ICE
 Cambridge AS/A Level
 Cambridge AICE

MIS is also currently a candidate for accreditation from the Western Association of Schools and Colleges (WASC).

Demographics 
Staff at MIS come from varied international backgrounds including Australia, England, Ireland, Germany, Spain, India, New Zealand, the Philippines, Russia, South Africa, and the USA. Most classes have an assistant teacher who works closely with the classroom teacher, especially in the area of EAL support.

There are 25 different nationalities represented in the student body of over 1000 students. The majority of students are Myanmar. There is a strong representation of students with Chinese nationality.

MIS Year levels and programmes of study 
Primary School
 Nursery & Kindergarten (3–5 years)
 Learning takes place in a supportive and stimulating environment.  Through play, music and the arts children lay foundations for further studies.  An emphasis is placed on phonetics as a lead up to reading.
 Years 1–6 (5–11 years)
 Core subjects of Mathematics, English, Science, Information & Communication Technology and Social Studies Enrichment courses in Art, Music, Physical Education and Myanmar Studies Extracurricular and after school activities including Board games, Modern Dance, Glee Club, Speed Typing, Card Making

Secondary School
 Years 7, 8 and 9
 Broad and balanced programme of international study developed by Cambridge International Education
 Core subjects including English, Mathematics, Science, Social Studies, ICT
 Enrichment courses in Music, Art, Drama, Myanmar Studies and Physical Education
 Year 10 and 11
 IGCSE examinations in English, Mathematics, Computer science, Coordinated Science (Biology, Chemistry, Physics), History, Business Studies, Additional maths and Geography
 Enrichment courses including Drama and Food & Nutrition
 Extra-curricular activities include sports, clubs and the arts
 Field trips to expand the classroom learning process by visiting cultural, historical, entertainment or business establishments in the local area or further afield

References

External links 

 http://www.mis-edu.com/

International schools in Myanmar
Education in Yangon